Pyrgetos F.C. is a Greek football club, based in Pyrgetos, Larissa, founded in 1960 and in Football League 2 for the 2013-14 season.

Football clubs in Thessaly